The 2022–23 Orlando Magic season is the 34th season of the franchise in the National Basketball Association (NBA).

Draft picks

The Magic had the first overall pick in addition to two second round selections.

Roster

Standings

Division

Conference

Game log

Preseason 

|- style="background:#fcc;"
| 1
| October 3
| @ Memphis
| 
| Cole Anthony (17)
| Bol Bol (6)
| R. J. Hampton (7)
| FedEx Forum13,431
| 0–1
|- style="background:#cfc;"
| 2
| October 6
| @ San Antonio
| 
| Wendell Carter Jr. (20)
| Wendell Carter Jr. (10)
| Banchero, Carter Jr., Hampton, Suggs, F. Wagner (3)
| AT&T Center11,561
| 1–1
|- style="background:#cfc;"
| 3
| October 7
| @ Dallas
| 
| Paolo Banchero (19)
| Wendell Carter Jr. (8)
| Anthony, Carter Jr. (5)
| American Airlines Center19,360
| 2–1
|-style="background:#cfc;"
| 4
| October 11
| Memphis
| 
| Wendell Carter Jr. (18)
| Franz Wagner (10)
| Franz Wagner (8)
| Amway Center16,006
| 3–1
|-style="background:#cfc;"
| 5
| October 14
| Cleveland
| 
| Paolo Banchero (17)
| Bamba, Carter Jr. (7)
| Franz Wagner (4)
| Amway Center17,063
| 4–1

Regular season 

|- style="background:#fcc;"
| 1
| October 19
| @ Detroit
| 
| Paolo Banchero (27)
| Wendell Carter Jr. (11)
| Banchero, F. Wagner (5)
| Little Caesars Arena20,190
| 0–1
|- style="background:#fcc;"
| 2
| October 21
| @ Atlanta
| 
| Cole Anthony (25)
| Paolo Banchero (12)
| Franz Wagner (3)
| State Farm Arena17,822
| 0–2
|- style="background:#fcc;"
| 3
| October 22
| Boston
| 
| Terrence Ross (29)
| Wendell Carter Jr. (12)
| Cole Anthony (6)
| Amway Center19,299
| 0–3
|- style="background:#fcc;"
| 4
| October 24
| @ New York
| 
| Paolo Banchero (21)
| Wendell Carter Jr. (11)
| Franz Wagner (5)
| Madison Square Garden18,800
| 0–4
|- style="background:#fcc;"
| 5
| October 26
| @ Cleveland
| 
| Paolo Banchero (29)
| Bol Bol (10)
| Anthony, F. Wagner (5)
| Rocket Mortgage FieldHouse19,432
| 0–5
|- style="background:#cfc;"
| 6
| October 28
| Charlotte
| 
| Paolo Banchero (21)
| Paolo Banchero (12)
| Paolo Banchero (7)
| Amway Center18,846
| 1–5
|- style="background:#fcc;"
| 7
| October 30
| @ Dallas
| 
| Paolo Banchero (18)
| Bol Bol (11)
| Banchero, Carter Jr., F. Wagner (4)
| American Airlines Center20,042
| 1–6

|- style="background:#fcc;"
| 8
| November 1
| @ Oklahoma City
| 
| Wendell Carter Jr. (30)
| Bol, Carter Jr. (12)
| Franz Wagner (7)
| Paycom Center13,109
| 1–7
|- style="background:#cfc;"
| 9
| November 3
| Golden State
| 
| Jalen Suggs (26)
| Chuma Okeke (9)
| Jalen Suggs (9)
| Amway Center18,846
| 2–7
|- style="background:#fcc;"
| 10
| November 5
| Sacramento
| 
| Paolo Banchero (33)
| Paolo Banchero (15)
| Carter Jr., F. Wagner (6)
| Amway Center18,846
| 2–8
|- style="background:#fcc;"
| 11
| November 7
| Houston
| 
| Paolo Banchero (30)
| Wendell Carter Jr. (7)
| Franz Wagner (7)
| Amway Center15,441
| 2–9
|- style="background:#cfc;"
| 12
| November 9
| Dallas
| 
| Franz Wagner (22)
| Wendell Carter Jr. (12)
| Franz Wagner (6)
| Amway Center18,165
| 3–9
|- style="background:#cfc;"
| 13
| November 11
| Phoenix
| 
| Wendell Carter Jr. (20)
| Bol Bol (15)
| Carter Jr., Suggs (5)
| Amway Center15,879
| 4–9
|- style="background:#fcc;"
| 14
| November 14
| Charlotte
| 
| Franz Wagner (23)
| Mo Bamba (11)
| Jalen Suggs (7)
| Amway Center15,018
| 4–10
|- style="background:#fcc;"
| 15
| November 16
| Minnesota
| 
| Bol Bol (26)
| Bol Bol (12)
| Jalen Suggs (6)
| Amway Center16,527
| 4–11
|- style="background:#cfc;"
| 16
| November 18
| @ Chicago
| 
| Wendell Carter Jr. (21)
| Bol Bol (10)
| Suggs, F. Wagner (8)
| United Center21,031
| 5–11
|- style="background:#fcc;"
| 17
| November 19
| @ Indiana
| 
| Franz Wagner (29)
| Bol Bol (11)
| Jalen Suggs (8)
| Gainbridge Fieldhouse14,478
| 5–12
|- style="background:#fcc;"
| 18
| November 21
| @ Indiana
| 
| Franz Wagner (20)
| Bol Bol (9)
| R. J. Hampton (5)
| Gainbridge Fieldhouse14,029
| 5–13
|- style="background:#fcc;"
| 19
| November 25
| Philadelphia
| 
| Franz Wagner (24)
| Bol Bol (8)
| Bamba, Suggs (4)
| Amway Center15,384
| 5–14
|- style="background:#fcc;"
| 20
| November 27
| Philadelphia
| 
| Paolo Banchero (18)
| Moritz Wagner (6)
| Gary Harris (5)
| Amway Center16,218
| 5–15
|- style="background:#fcc;"
| 21
| November 28
| @ Brooklyn
| 
| Banchero, Bol (24)
| Caleb Houstan (7)
| Paolo Banchero (5)
| Barclays Center15,704
| 5–16
|- style="background:#fcc;"
| 22
| November 30
| Atlanta
| 
| Franz Wagner (22)
| F. Wagner, M. Wagner (6)
| Moritz Wagner (8)
| Amway Center15,344
| 5–17

|- style="background:#fcc;"
| 23
| December 2
| @ Cleveland
| 
| Paolo Banchero (22)
| Moritz Wagner (9)
| Markelle Fultz (6)
| Rocket Mortgage FieldHouse19,432
| 5–18
|- style="background:#fcc;"
| 24
| December 3
| @ Toronto
| 
| Bol, Ross (18)
| Bol Bol (7)
| Cole Anthony (5)
| Scotiabank Arena19,800
| 5–19
|- style="background:#fcc;"
| 25
| December 5
| Milwaukee
| 
| Franz Wagner (25)
| Banchero, M. Wagner (12)
| Paolo Banchero (7)
| Amway Center16,174
| 5–20
|- style="background:#cfc;"
| 26
| December 7
| L.A. Clippers
| 
| Paolo Banchero (23)
| Moritz Wagner (13)
| Anthony, Fultz (4)
| Amway Center14,429
| 6–20
|- style="background:#cfc;"
| 27
| December 9
| Toronto
| 
| Franz Wagner (34)
| Mo Bamba (13)
| Anthony, Fultz (5)
| Amway Center17,008
| 7–20
|- style="background:#cfc;"
| 28
| December 11
| Toronto
| 
| Franz Wagner (23)
| Paolo Banchero (12)
| Cole Anthony (6)
| Amway Center16,891
| 8–20
|- style="background:#cfc;"
| 29
| December 14
| Atlanta
| 
| Franz Wagner (24)
| Bamba, Bol, Fultz (7)
| Markelle Fultz (9)
| Amway Center16,002
| 9–20
|- style="background:#cfc;"
| 30
| December 16
| @ Boston
| 
| Moritz Wagner (25)
| Mo Bamba (12)
| Paolo Banchero (5)
| TD Garden19,156
| 10–20
|- style="background:#cfc;"
| 31
| December 18
| @ Boston
| 
| Paolo Banchero (31)
| Bol Bol (8)
| Markelle Fultz (5)
| TD Garden19,156
| 11–20
|- style="background:#fcc;"
| 32
| December 19
| @ Atlanta
| 
| Markelle Fultz (24)
| Moritz Wagner (10)
| Markelle Fultz (9)
| State Farm Arena17,809
| 11–21
|- style="background:#cfc;"
| 33
| December 21
| @ Houston
| 
| Franz Wagner (25)
| Paolo Banchero (13)
| Cole Anthony (6)
| Toyota Center15,965
| 12–21
|- style="background:#cfc;"
| 34
| December 23
| San Antonio
| 
| Cole Anthony (23)
| Cole Anthony (10)
| Cole Anthony (9)
| Amway Center18,425
| 13–21
|- style="background:#fcc;"
| 35
| December 27
| L.A. Lakers
| 
| Markelle Fultz (16)
| Bamba, Banchero, Bol (5)
| Anthony, Carter Jr., F. Wagner, M. Wagner (4)
| Amway Center19,482
| 13–22
|- style="background:#fcc;"
| 36
| December 28
| @ Detroit
| 
| Franz Wagner (19)
| Wendell Carter Jr. (8)
| Markelle Fultz (9)
| Little Caesars Arena20,190
| 13–23
|- style="background:#fcc;"
| 37
| December 30
| Washington
| 
| Franz Wagner (28)
| Bol Bol (9)
| Franz Wagner (8)
| Amway Center19,040
| 13–24

|- style="background:#cfc;"
| 38
| January 4
| Oklahoma City
| 
| Paolo Banchero (25)
| Wendell Carter Jr. (13)
| Paolo Banchero (7)
| Amway Center18,925
| 14–24
|- style="background:#fcc;"
| 39
| January 5
| Memphis
| 
| Paolo Banchero (30)
| Paolo Banchero (9)
| Markelle Fultz (9)
| Amway Center19,184
| 14–25
|- style="background:#cfc;"
| 40
| January 7
| @ Golden State
| 
| Paolo Banchero (25)
| Wendell Carter Jr. (10)
| Markelle Fultz (7)
| Chase Center18,061
| 15–25
|- style="background:#fcc;"
| 41
| January 9
| @ Sacramento
| 
| Paolo Banchero (17)
| Paolo Banchero (8)
| Markelle Fultz (5)
| Golden 1 Center16,499
| 15–26
|- style="background:#cfc;"
| 42
| January 10
| @ Portland
| 
| Franz Wagner (29)
| Banchero, Carter Jr. (10)
| Markelle Fultz (7)
| Moda Center18,176
| 16–26
|- style="background:#fcc;"
| 43
| January 13
| @ Utah
| 
| Franz Wagner (26)
| Wendell Carter Jr. (10)
| Markelle Fultz (6)
| Vivint Arena18,206
| 16–27
|- style="background:#fcc;"
| 44
| January 15
| @ Denver
| 
| Markelle Fultz (20)
| Markelle Fultz (7)
| Anthony, Fultz (6)
| Ball Arena19,641
| 16–28
|- style="background:#cfc;"
| 45
| January 20
| New Orleans
| 
| Franz Wagner (30)
| Wendell Carter Jr. (9)
| Franz Wagner (9)
| Amway Center19,025
| 17–28
|- style="background:#fcc;"
| 46
| January 21
| @ Washington
| 
| Markelle Fultz (23)
| Wendell Carter Jr. (9)
| Markelle Fultz (8)
| Capital One Arena18,171
| 17–29
|- style="background:#cfc;"
| 47
| January 23
| Boston
| 
| Paolo Banchero (23)
| Wendell Carter Jr. (11)
| Franz Wagner (6)
| Amway Center19,196
| 18–29
|- style="background:#cfc;"
| 48
| January 25
| Indiana
| 
| Paolo Banchero (23)
| Wendell Carter Jr. (10)
| Markelle Fultz (8)
| Amway Center18,846
| 19–29
|- style="background:#fcc;"
| 49
| January 27
| @ Miami
| 
| Anthony, Banchero, F. Wagner (19)
| Wendell Carter Jr. (8)
| Markelle Fultz (6)
| Miami-Dade Arena19,788
| 19–30
|- style="background:#fcc;"
| 50
| January 28
| Chicago
| 
| Moritz Wagner (27)
| Paolo Banchero (7)
| Cole Anthony (6)
| Amway Center18,846
| 19–31
|- style="background:#cfc;"
| 51
| January 30
| @ Philadelphia
| 
| Paolo Banchero (29)
| Banchero, Carter Jr. (9)
| Markelle Fultz (10)
| Wells Fargo Center19,812
| 20–31

|- style="background:#fcc;"
| 52
| February 1
| @ Philadelphia
| 
| Markelle Fultz (18)
| Wendell Carter Jr. (13)
| Banchero, Suggs (3)
| Wells Fargo Center20,885
| 20–32
|- style="background:#cfc;"
| 53
| February 3
| @ Minnesota
| 
| Cole Anthony (20)
| Anthony, Banchero (8)
| Cole Anthony (6)
| Target Center17,136
| 21–32
|- style="background:#cfc;"
| 54
| February 5
| @ Charlotte
| 
| Paolo Banchero (22)
| Wendell Carter Jr. (12)
| Anthony, Banchero, Fultz (5)
| Spectrum Center18,510
| 22–32
|- style="background:#fcc;"
| 55
| February 7
| New York
| 
| Markelle Fultz (21)
| Paolo Banchero (8)
| Markelle Fultz (6)
| Amway Center19,438
| 22–33
|- style="background:#cfc;"
| 56
| February 9
| Denver
| 
| Wendell Carter Jr. (19)
| Paolo Banchero (10)
| Cole Anthony (7)
| Amway Center18,846
| 23–33
|- style="background:#fcc;"
| 57
| February 11
| Miami
| 
| Markelle Fultz (17)
| Paolo Banchero (13)
| Cole Anthony (6)
| Amway Center18,223
| 23–34
|- style="background:#cfc;"
| 58
| February 13
| @ Chicago
| 
| Paolo Banchero (22)
| Markelle Fultz (10)
| Markelle Fultz (9)
| United Center20,767
| 24–34
|- style="background:#fcc;"
| 59
| February 14
| @ Toronto
| 
| Wendell Carter Jr. (26)
| Bol Bol (7)
| Franz Wagner (6)
| Scotiabank Arena19,800
| 24–35
|- align="center"
|colspan="9" bgcolor="#bbcaff"|All-Star Break
|- style="background:#cfc;"
| 60
| February 23
| Detroit
| 
| Franz Wagner (21)
| Wendell Carter Jr. (14)
| Markelle Fultz (8)
| Amway Center18,846
| 25–35
|- style="background:#fcc;"
| 61
| February 25
| Indiana
| 
| Franz Wagner (21)
| Wendell Carter Jr. (11)
| Cole Anthony (5)
| Amway Center19,231
| 25–36
|- style="background:#cfc;"
| 62
| February 27
| @ New Orleans
| 
| Paolo Banchero (29)
| Wendell Carter Jr. (11)
| Markelle Fultz (5)
| Smoothie King Center16,038
| 26–36

|- style="background:#fcc;"
| 63
| March 1
| @ Milwaukee
| 
| Markelle Fultz (21)
| Wendell Carter Jr. (10)
| Banchero, Fultz (5)
| Fiserv Forum17,354
| 26–37
|- style="background:#cfc;"
| 64
| March 3
| @ Charlotte
| 
| Paolo Banchero (31)
| Wendell Carter Jr. (9)
| Paolo Banchero (5)
| Spectrum Center16,683
| 27–37
|- style="background:#fcc;"
| 65
| March 5
| Portland
| 
| Paolo Banchero (26)
| Bol Bol (8)
| Markelle Fultz (8)
| Amway Center18,846
| 27–38
|- style="background:#fcc;"
| 66
| March 7
| Milwaukee
| 
| Cole Anthony (23)
| Bitadze, M. Wagner (8)
| Franz Wagner (6)
| Amway Center16,110
| 27–39
|- style="background:#fcc;"
| 67
| March 9
| Utah
| 
| Paolo Banchero (26)
| Paolo Banchero (8)
| Fultz, Suggs (6)
| Amway Center16,552
| 27–40
|- style="background:#cfc;"
| 68
| March 11
| Miami
| 
| Wendell Carter Jr. (27)
| Wendell Carter Jr. (11)
| Paolo Banchero (9)
| Amway Center17,347
| 28–40
|- style="background:#fcc;"
| 69
| March 14
| @ San Antonio
| 
| Paolo Banchero (27)
| Wendell Carter Jr. (10)
| Markelle Fultz (6)
| AT&T Center13,708
| 28–41
|- style="background:#fcc;"
| 70
| March 16
| @ Phoenix
| 
| Markelle Fultz (25)
| Franz Wagner (10)
| Markelle Fultz (9)
| Footprint Center17,071
| 28–42
|- style="background:#cfc;"
| 71
| March 18
| @ L.A. Clippers
| 
| Markelle Fultz (28)
| Wendell Carter Jr. (12)
| Paolo Banchero (6)
| Crypto.com Arena17,533
| 29–42
|- style="background:#fcc;"
| 72
| March 19
| @ L.A. Lakers
| 
| Banchero, F. Wagner (21)
| Wendell Carter Jr. (11)
| Markelle Fultz (10)
| Crypto.com Arena18,997
| 29–43
|- style="background:#;"
| 73
| March 21
| Washington
| 
| 
| 
| 
| Amway Center
| 
|- style="background:#;"
| 74
| March 23
| New York
| 
| 
| 
| 
| Amway Center
| 
|- style="background:#;"
| 75
| March 26
| Brooklyn
| 
| 
| 
| 
| Amway Center
| 
|- style="background:#;"
| 76
| March 28
| @ Memphis
| 
| 
| 
| 
| FedExForum
| 
|- style="background:#;"
| 77
| March 31
| @ Washington
| 
| 
| 
| 
| Capital One Arena
| 

|- style="background:#;"
| 78
| April 2
| Detroit
| 
| 
| 
| 
| Amway Center
| 
|- style="background:#;"
| 79
| April 4
| Cleveland
| 
| 
| 
| 
| Amway Center
| 
|- style="background:#;"
| 80
| April 6
| Cleveland
| 
| 
| 
| 
| Amway Center
| 
|- style="background:#;"
| 81
| April 7
| @ Brooklyn
| 
| 
| 
| 
| Barclays Center
| 
|- style="background:#;"
| 82
| April 9
| @ Miami
| 
| 
| 
| 
| Miami-Dade Arena
|

Transactions

Trades

Free agency

Re-signed

Additions

Subtractions

References

2022–23
Orlando Magic
Orlando Magic
Orlando Magic